The Spiel des Jahres (Game of the Year) is an award for board and card games, created in 1978 with the purpose of rewarding family-friendly game design, and promoting excellent games in the German market. It is thought that the existence and popularity of the award was one of the major drivers of the quality of games coming out of Germany, particularly in the 1980s and 1990s. A Spiel des Jahres nomination can increase the typical sales of a game from 500–3,000 copies to around 10,000, and the winner can usually expect to sell as many as 500,000 copies.

Award criteria
The award is given by a jury of German-speaking board game critics from Germany, Austria, and Switzerland, who review games released in Germany in the preceding twelve months. The games considered for the award are family-style games. War games, role-playing games, collectible card games, and other complicated, highly competitive, or hobbyist games are outside the scope of the award.  Since 1989, there has been a separate award for children's games.  The jury is not subject to public scrutiny and members of the public are not offered the opportunity to influence the voting.

On occasion, the jury has awarded a special prize for more complex games, such as Agricola in 2008 or World Without End in 2010.  Prior to 2011, this award was an exceptional award which was not necessarily awarded annually. In 2011, however, this practice was formalized when the jury created a new category for more complex games called Kennerspiel des Jahres. Along with the nominations, the jury also gives a list of recommended games, and occasionally gives out special prizes for games which will not be considered for the main award. The criteria on which a game is evaluated are:
 game concept (originality, playability, game value)
 rule structure (composition, clearness, comprehensibility)
 layout (box, board, rules),
 design (functionality, workmanship)

The jury does not release its scoring system or provide insight into how the categories are weighted.

Awards and nominees

1999 awards

2000 awards

2001 awards

2002 awards

2003 awards

2004 awards

2005 awards

The nominations for the 2005 award were announced on May 8, 2005, and the winner on June 27, 2005.

2006 awards
The nominations for the 2006 award were announced on May 28, 2006, and the winner on July 17, 2006.

Along with the nominations, the jury also assigned two special prizes for games which it felt were too demanding to count as 'family style' games.
Fantasy game: Shadows over Camelot – Serge Laget and Bruno Cathala, Days of Wonder
Complex game: Caylus – William Attia, Ẏstari Games

2007 awards
The nominations for the 2007 award were announced on May 20, 2007, and the winner on June 25, 2007.

2008 awards
The nominations for the 2008 award were announced on May 25, 2008, and the winner on June 30, 2008.

2009 awards
The nominations for the 2009 award were announced on May 24, 2009 and the winner on June 29, 2009.

2010 awards
The nominations for the 2010 award were announced on May 31, 2010, and the winner on June 28, 2010.

2011 awards
The nominations for the 2011 awards were announced on May 23, 2011, and the winners on June 27, 2011. This was the first year the Connoisseur-gamer Game of the Year award was given, an award for more complex games.

2012 awards
The nominations for the 2012 awards were announced on May 21, 2012, and the winners on July 9, 2012.

2013 awards
The nominations for the 2013 awards were announced on May 21, 2013, and the Spiel and Kennerspiel winners were announced on July 8, 2013. The Kinderspiel (Children's) Game of the Year was announced on June 12, 2013.

2014 awards
The nominations for the 2014 awards were announced on May 19, 2014.  The Children's Game of the Year was announced on June 23, and the Game of the Year and Connoisseur's Game of the Year were announced on July 14.

2015 awards
The nominations for the 2015 awards were announced on May 18, 2015. The Kinderspiel des Jahres winner were announced on Monday, June 8, 2015, and the Spiel and Kennerspiel winners were announced on Monday, July 6, 2015.

2016 awards 
The nominations for the 2016 awards were announced on May 23, 2016, and the winners on Monday July 18, 2016.

2017 awards 

The nominations for the 2017 award were announced on May 22, 2017.  The winner for Children's Game of the Year was announced on June 19, 2017.  The winners for Game of the Year and Connoisseur-gamer Game of the Year were announced on July 17, 2017.

2018 awards 

The nominations and the special prize for the 2018 award were announced on May 14, 2018. The winner for Children's Game of the Year was announced on June 11, 2018. The winners for Game of the Year and Connoisseur-gamer Game of the Year were announced on July 23, 2018.

2019 awards 

The nominations for the 2019 award were announced on May 20, 2019.  The winner for Children's Game of the Year was announced on June 24, 2019

2020 awards 

The nominations for the 2020 award were announced on May 18, 2020. The award for Children's Game of the Year was announced on June 15, 2020. The winners were announced on July 20, 2020.

2021 awards 

The nominations for the 2021 award were announced on May 18, 2021.

2022 awards 

The nominations for the 2022 award were announced on May 23, 2022.

All winners

Game of the year

Connoisseurs' game of the year

Children's game of the year

Special awards

See also
Deutscher Spiele Preis
International Gamers Award
As d'Or
Origins Award

References

External links
Spiel des Jahres official website

Game awards
Board game awards
German awards
 
Awards established in 1978
1978 establishments in West Germany